Susann McDonald (born May 26, 1935) is an American-born classical harpist. In addition to a successful performing career, she has made a number of recordings and held significant academic and organizational posts.

Life
McDonald was born in Rock Island, Illinois. After studies in Chicago and New York City, at age 15 she entered the Conservatoire de Paris, where she studied with Henriette Renié and Lily Laskine and in 1955 was the first American to win the Premiere Prix de Harpe. Not long thereafter, she placed second in the first International Harp Competition in Israel; in 1970, she returned to the competition as a judge. Around this time she also had an audience with Juliana of the Netherlands following a recital at the Concertgebouw.

From her early years, McDonald toured widely; besides Israel and the Netherlands, her travels took her to South America and Canada for recitals and to Europe for radio and television broadcasts. She also began to develop what would be a noteworthy academic career. For a time, she served simultaneously as head of harp departments at the Universities of Arizona and Southern California and California State College at Los Angeles. From 1975 to 1985, she was the head of the harp department at the Juilliard School. She then took a position as chairman of the harp department at Indiana University-Bloomington in the Jacobs School of Music, which has the largest harp department in the world; somewhat later, she was named a Distinguished Professor of Music.

McDonald has also played a prominent role in organizations devoted to the harp. She is the artistic director of the World Harp Congress and the honorary president of the Association Internationale des Harpistes, and she is the founder and music director of the USA International Harp Competition. In 2008, McDonald received the World Harp Congress Award of Recognition for Service to the International Harp Community at the Tenth World Harp Congress.  Only three other individuals have received this award.

Past students include Nancy Allen, Erzsébet Gaál, Cristina Braga, Şirin Pancaroğlu, Anna-Maria Ravnopolska-Dean, María Luisa Rayan-Forero, Jessica Suchy-Pilalis, JoAnn Turovsky, Naoko Yoshino, Kristie Smith, and Natalie Salzman.

On October 31, 2002, in Bloomington, Indiana, a fire consumed the home that McDonald shared with organist Diane Bish. Among the many personal possessions lost were a Yamaha grand piano and Rodgers digital organ, but several of McDonald's prized harps were saved by firefighters, and fortunately both women escaped without injuries.

Recordings
McDonald in the early 1970s recorded LPs of harp sonatas of Jan Ladislav Dussek and Antonio Rosetti for Orion Records, presently available as compact disc reissues from Marquis Music; in 1966 she had participated in a recording of vocal and instrumental concerted music by Joseph Frederick Wagner for the same label. More recently, McDonald has recorded encore pieces for Delos International on both traditional and concert harps and traditional French harp literature, music for flute and harp with Louise DiTullio, 20th-century composers, and music by Rosetti and Louis Spohr in a series of releases for Klavier Records. She also recorded single issues including organ music with Diane Bish for the Allen Organ Company, music of Miklós Rózsa with oboist Allan Vogel for the Bay Cities label, recital music for Boite a Musique, and mostly 20th-century literature for Music Works-Harp Editions.

References

External links
 

1935 births
Living people
Jacobs School of Music faculty
American classical harpists
American women music educators
21st-century American women